Martine Albert (born September 17, 1973 in Rimouski, Quebec) is a Canadian biathlete.

Albert began competing in the biathlon in 1993, and had her most successful World Cup seasons in the late 90s, including her highest career finishes in World Cup events; 13th in races in Oslo and Pokljuka. She participated in eight Biathlon World Championships between 1995 and 2005, with her best showing coming in 1998, when she finished 23rd in the pursuit race in Pokljuka.

Albert competed in three events at the 2006 Olympics in Turin. Her best individual showing was in the 15 kilometre individual, and she also raced in the Canadian relay team, ending up 17th in that race.

References

External links
IBU biography
Official Site

1973 births
Living people
Olympic biathletes of Canada
French Quebecers
Biathletes at the 2006 Winter Olympics
People from Rimouski
Canadian female biathletes
21st-century Canadian women